American rapper Lil' Kim has released five studio albums, one remix album, four mixtapes, forty-two singles (including twenty-five as a featured artist), and thirteen promotional singles. In 1994, Kim was a member of the hip hop group Junior M.A.F.I.A. Their first album, Conspiracy, was released in August 1995, and has been certified gold by the Recording Industry Association of America (RIAA). It spawned the gold and platinum-certified top-twenty singles, "Player's Anthem", "Get Money", and "I Need You Tonight".

Originally signed to Big Beat Records, an Atlantic subsidiary, Kim's debut studio album, Hard Core, was released in November 1996, and sold over one million copies in the United States. It produced three singles, of which two were certified gold and platinum by the RIAA. Her second album The Notorious K.I.M. was released in June 2000. It spawned two singles, "No Matter What They Say" and "How Many Licks?". In 2001, Kim collaborated alongside Christina Aguilera, Mýa, and Pink on the Grammy Award-winning number-one song "Lady Marmalade", a cover version recorded for the soundtrack of the film Moulin Rouge! (2001).

After a musical hiatus, Kim released La Bella Mafia in 2003. Its spawned two singles "The Jump Off" and "Magic Stick". Her fourth studio album, The Naked Truth, released in 2005, reach number six in the US. It spawned the singles "Lighters Up", which reached the top forty in the United States, and "Whoa".

Albums

Studio albums

Remix albums

Mixtapes

Singles

As lead artist

As featured artist

Promotional singles

Other charted songs

Album appearances

Soundtrack appearances

Other appearances

See also
 Lil' Kim videography

Notes

References

External links
 
 
 

Discography
Discographies of American artists
Hip hop discographies